Marko Lozo (born 12 July 1988) is a Croatian football manager and former player.

Playing career

Club
He had a spell with Austrian fourth tier-side SV Güssing.

Coaching career
Lozo started as the head coach of Youth Academy of Hajduk Split. On 29 May 2015, when Damir Burić became a manager, Lozo became an assistant manager. Burić was sacked in June 2016 and new manager became Marijan Pušnik, but Lozo remained under the coaching staff. In December 2016, Pušnik was sacked and Lozo was named the caretaker manager, while Joan Carrillo did not become the manager. In 2017 he left Hajduk Split.

On 2 October 2018, he was named the new manager of Croatian First Football League club Rudeš. In December 2018, he was sacked by club after poor results. In March 2021, he was announced as Međimurje's new manager.

References

External links
 

1988 births
Living people
Footballers from Split, Croatia
Association football forwards
Croatian footballers
NK Imotski players
HNK Šibenik players
NK Rudeš players
Croatian Football League players
First Football League (Croatia) players
Austrian Landesliga players
Croatian expatriate footballers
Expatriate footballers in Austria
Croatian expatriate sportspeople in Austria
Croatian football managers
NK Rudeš managers
NK Međimurje managers